Thriller – A Cruel Picture is a 1973 Swedish rape-and-revenge exploitation film written and directed by Bo Arne Vibenius under the pseudonym Alex Fridolinski, and starring Christina Lindberg and Heinz Hopf. It tells the story of a mute young woman who is forced into heroin addiction and prostitution, and her subsequent revenge on the men responsible.

The film was released in the United States in a truncated version by American International Pictures under several alternative titles, such as They Call Her One Eye, Hooker's Revenge and The Swedish Vice-Girl.

Plot 
A quiet girl, Madeleine, is sexually abused as a child, and the trauma makes her mute. Years later, while living on her parents' farm as a teenager, Madeleine misses the bus into town, and accepts a ride from a pimp named Tony. Tony takes the naive Madeleine out for lunch before bringing her back to his home, where he incapacitates her and repeatedly injects her with heroin, causing her to become addicted as a means of forcing her into prostitution.

To hide the fact that Madeleine was kidnapped, Tony writes hateful letters to her parents, signing them with Madeleine's name. Her parents become so distraught over their daughter's apparent betrayal that they commit suicide. When Madeleine initially refuses to have sex with a client, Tony beats her before cutting out her eyeball with a scalpel. Donning an eyepatch over her extracted eye, Madeleine is subjected to a never-ending series of demoralizing sexual encounters with both male and female clients. Defeated by the state of her life, Madeleine is inspired by one of Tony's other prostitutes, Sally, to create an escape plan for herself.

Madeleine begins covertly stashing some of her earnings, and takes lessons in driving, shooting, and martial arts, all unbeknownst to Tony. Using the money she has stashed away, Madeleine purchases a car, as well as a variety of weapons—including a sawed-off shotgun—that she stores in a shed she has rented in the countryside. One night, she discovers that Tony has murdered Sally, and finds Sally's bed soaked with blood.

Finally at her breaking point, Madeleine begins to dispatch the clients who have abused her, first stalking one of the men, and shooting him to death with her shotgun on his front doorstep. Next, Madeleine locates another john dining at a restaurant with one of Madeleine's female clients, who regularly physically abused her, and shoots them both to death. She next travels to a warehouse on an ocean dock where she finds two other male abusers, and kills them as well. Police arrive at the warehouse and find Madeleine seated with her shotgun. When they attempt to arrest her, she uses her martial arts training to incapacitate both officers and break free.

Madeleine absconds with the police car, and flees to a rural fishing village, causing a series of reckless and fatal car accidents in her wake. She is pursued by both Tony and police, and engages in a shootout in the village before fleeing back into the countryside, where she waits along a stone wall. Tony arrives and feigns sympathy, pretending he will reason with her. At his insistence, Madeleine puts down her shotgun, after which Tony threatens to shoot her with a pistol; before he can, however, she triggers a booby trap to distract him, and shoots him in both knees, incapacitating him. She proceeds to bind him with rope, and drags him to a meadow using a horse. There, she buries his body with stones, leaving only his head above ground, and ties a rope around his neck, which she tethers to the horse. Madeliene sits calmly and watches as Tony is strangled to death. Once he dies, she drives away in the police car.

Cast

Production 

Director Bo Arne Vibenius sought to make "the most commercial film ever made", as he had lost money on an earlier film, and needed to recoup his loss. Rumors allege that the filmmakers used an actual corpse during the film's eye gouging scene, which has since become controversial because of these rumors. Hardcore pornographic sequences were edited into the film to profit off of the trend of pornography in Denmark and Sweden, which was being liberalized at the time.

In Daniel Ekeroth's book on Swedish exploitation movies, Swedish Sensationsfilms: A Clandestine History of Sex, Thrillers, and Kicker Cinema, it is revealed that the producers took out a huge life insurance policy on star Christina Lindberg, as real ammunition was used in the action sequences, and that she was asked to inject saline solution during the heroin-use scenes.

Release

Censorship and distribution
The original running time was 107 minutes. After being banned by the Swedish film censorship board, the film was truncated to 104 minutes and then 86 minutes, but still banned. It was finally released after being cut down to 82 minutes. In the United States, the film was distributed by American International Pictures, also in a truncated cut running 82 minutes. American International Pictures released the film in mid-1974 under the alternate titles Thriller and They Call Her One Eye, and, in 1975, as Hooker's Revenge.

Critical response

TV Guide rated the film three out of four stars, writing, "Not for the fainthearted, or the easily bored, this brutal and depressing film nevertheless is not easily forgotten."

Time Out gave the film a negative review, criticizing the film's overuse of slow motion, hardcore scenes, and soundtrack, stating that it fails to leave the lingering emotional impact of its convictions. A.H. Weiler from The New York Times offered the film similar criticism, calling it "dreary", and cited Lindberg as the film's only notable aspect.

Home media
Synapse Films released Thriller – A Cruel Picture on DVD in October 2004 in a limited edition featuring the extended 107-minute cut. In 2005, Synapse released the shorter U.S. version as a standalone DVD, deeming it the "Vengeance Edition". On May 31, 2022, Vinegar Syndrome released the film in a 4-disc 4K UHD and Blu-ray combination set limited to 10,000 units. This edition features the original 108-minute cut, as well as an exclusive UHD of the 90-minute English-language version entitled They Call Her One Eye. After the limited edition set sold out in late-May 2022, Vinegar Syndrome made a standard edition 4K UHD and Blu-ray set available (also featuring the They Call Her One Eye cut, but only on Blu-ray).

Legacy 

Thriller – A Cruel Picture was marketed as the first film ever to be completely banned in Sweden, although the first one actually was Victor Sjöström's The Gardener from 1912. It has received a cult following and was the basis behind Quentin Tarantino's Kill Bill character Elle Driver (Daryl Hannah).

Notes

References

Sources

External links 
 
 

1973 films
1970s action thriller films
1970s erotic thriller films
1970s exploitation films
1973 LGBT-related films
1970s martial arts films
1970s Swedish-language films
1970s vigilante films
American International Pictures films
Films scored by Ralph Lundsten
Films about prostitution
Films shot in Sweden
Lesbian-related films
LGBT-related controversies in film
Obscenity controversies in film
Rape and revenge films
Swedish films about revenge
Swedish coming-of-age films
Swedish independent films
Swedish LGBT-related films
Swedish thriller films
1970s Swedish films
Censorship in Sweden
Film controversies in Sweden